Sançar is a surname of Turkish origin. It may also refer to:

Sancar, Kazan, village in Turkey
Sancar, Orta, village in Turkey
Sancar Paşa, İskele, district quarter in Cyprus